Defiance Memorial Airport  is a public use airport located four nautical miles (7 km) northwest of the central business district of Defiance, in Defiance County, Ohio, United States. It is owned by the Board of County Commissioners.

Facilities and aircraft 
It has one runway designated 12/30 with an asphalt surface measuring 4,197 by 72 feet (1,279 x 22 m).

For the 12-month period ending October 25, 2006, the airport had 9,130 aircraft operations, an average of 25 per day: 78% general aviation, 22% air taxi and <1% military. At that time there were 20 aircraft based at this airport: 90% single-engine, 5% multi-engine and 5% ultralight.

References

External links 
 TAS Aviation, the fixed-base operator (FBO)
 Aerial photo as of 2 April 1994 from USGS The National Map
 

Buildings and structures in Defiance County, Ohio
County airports in Ohio
Transportation in Defiance County, Ohio